Live Monsters is a live DVD by Depeche Mode's singer Dave Gahan. It was released by Mute Films on 1 March 2004. The DVD was filmed on 5 July 2003 at the Paris Olympia during Gahan's Paper Monsters Tour.

Gahan's backup band for the project included keyboardists Vincent Jones.

Track listing
 "Hidden Houses"
 "Hold On"
 "Dirty Sticky Floors"
 "A Question of Time"
 "Bitter Apple"
 "Black and Blue Again"
 "Stay"
 "A Little Piece"
 "Walking in My Shoes"
 "I Need You"
 "Bottle Living"
 "Personal Jesus"
 "Goodbye"
 "I Feel You" 
 "Never Let Me Down Again"

Bonus material
 "Dirty Sticky Floors" (Acoustic set from radio promotion appearance)
 "Bitter Apple" (Acoustic set from radio promotion appearance)
 "Black and Blue Again" (Acoustic set from radio promotion appearance)
Live Monsters - A short film

Soundtrack to Live Monsters

Soundtrack to Live Monsters is a first live album by Depeche Mode's singer Dave Gahan. It was released exclusively on iTunes by Mute Records on 7 March 2004.

Track listing
 "Hidden Houses"
 "Hold On"
 "Dirty Sticky Floors"
 "Bitter Apple"
 "Black and Blue Again"
 "Stay"
 "A Little Piece"
 "I Need You"
 "Bottle Living"
 "Goodbye"

Charts

References

External links
 Album information from the official micro-site
 Allmusic review 

Dave Gahan albums
Albums recorded at the Olympia (Paris)
2004 live albums
2004 video albums
Live video albums
Mute Records live albums
Mute Records video albums